Umljanović is a village in Ružić municipality, Šibenik-Knin County, Dalmatia, Croatia. Population is 148 (2011 census).

References

Populated places in Šibenik-Knin County